The Nurgan Regional Military Commission was a Chinese administrative seat established in Manchuria during the Ming dynasty, located on the banks of the Amur River, about 100 km from the sea, at Nurgan city (modern Tyr, Russia). Nurgan in the Jurchen language means “painting”.

History 
The seat was nominally established in 1409, but was abandoned in 1435.  Nurgan was the site of Yongning Temple (永寧寺), a Buddhist temple dedicated to Guanyin, that was founded by Yishiha (Išiqa) in 1413.  The founding of Yongning Temple is recorded in the Yongning Temple Stele with inscriptions in Chinese, Mongolian and Jurchen scripts. The commission was an important institution during the Ming rule of Manchuria, obtaining at least the nominal allegiance of the lower Amur's tribes to the Ming government.

By 1409, the Yongle Emperor's government, which had already established relations with the Haixi and Jianzhou Jurchens in southern Manchuria, ordered Yishiha to start preparations for an expedition to the lower Amur River region, to demonstrate the power of the Ming Empire to the Nurgan Jurchen populating the area and induce them to enter into relations with the empire, and to ensure that they would not create trouble for the Ming state when the latter went to war with the Eastern Mongols.

In 1413 Yishiha also visited the nearby coast of the Sakhalin Island, and granted Ming titles to a local chieftain.

Some sources report a Chinese fort existed at Aigun for about 20 years during the Yongle era on the left (northwestern) shore of the Amur downstream from the mouth of the Zeya River. This Ming Dynasty Aigun was located on the opposite bank to the later Aigun that was relocated during the Qing Dynasty.

Yishiha's last mission was connected to the retirement of the Nurgan chief and the "inauguration" of his son as his successor.  Yishiha attended the event in 1432, presenting the new chief a seal of authority and giving gifts to subordinate chieftains. This time Yishiha's fleet included 50 big ships with 2,000 soldiers, and they actually brought the new chief (who had been living in Beijing) to Tyr.

Tribute 
Nivkh women in Sakhalin married Han Chinese Ming officials when the Ming took tribute from Sakhalin and the Amur river region. Boluohe, Nanghar and Wuliehe were Yuan posts set up to receive tribute from the Ainu after their war with the Yuan ended in 1308. Ming Chinese outposts in Sakhalin and the Amur river area received animal skin tribute from Ainu on Sakhalin, Uilta and Nivkh in the 15th century after the Tyr based Yongning Temple was set up along with the Nurkan (Nurgan) outposts by the Yongle emperor in 1409. The Ming also held the post at Wuliehe and received marten pelt fur tribute from the assistant commander Alige in 1431 from Sakhalin after the Ming assigned titles like weizhenfu (official charged with subjugation), zhihui qianshi (assistance commander), zhihui tongzhi (vice commander) and Zhihuishi (commander) from Sakhalin indigenous headmen. The Ming received tribute from the headmen Alingge, Tuolingha, Sanchiha and Zhaluha in 1437. The position of headman among Sakhalin indigenous peoples was inherited paternally from father to son and the sons came with their fathers to Wuliehe.

Ming officials gave silk uniforms with the appropriate rank to the Sakhalin Ainu, Uilta and Nivkh after they gave tribute. The Maritime Province region had the Ming "system for subjugated peoples" implementers in it for the Sakhalin indigenous peoples. Sakhalin received iron tools from mainland Asia through this trade as Tungus groups joined in from 1456-1487. Local indigenous hierarchies had Ming Chinese given political offices integrated with them.

The Ming system on Sakhalin was continued by the Qing dynasty.

Due to Ming rule in Manchuria, Chinese cultural and religious influence such as Chinese New Year, the "Chinese god", Chinese motifs like the dragon, spirals, scrolls, and material goods like agriculture, husbandry, heating, iron cooking pots, silk, and cotton spread among the Amur natives like the Udeghes, Ulchis, and Nanais.

See also
 Manchuria under Ming rule

References 

Military history of the Ming dynasty
Military history of Manchuria
Khabarovsk Krai
1409 establishments in Asia
1435 disestablishments in Asia
15th-century establishments in China